So Yi-hyun (born Jo Woo-jung, 조우정; August 28, 1984) is a South Korean actress, with starring and supporting roles in Hyena, Assorted Gems, Gloria, Heartstrings, Glowing She, Cheongdam-dong Alice, and Who Are You?.

Personal life
So married actor In Gyo-jin on October 4, 2014. So and In had been friends for a decade before dating; they were co-stars in Aeja's Older Sister, Minja (2008) and Happy Ending (2012). Their first child, a daughter, was born on December 4, 2015. In October 2017, she gave birth to a second daughter.

Filmography

Television series

Film

Variety show

Music video

Awards and nominations

References

External links

 So E Hyun (소이현) at KeyEast

People from Jeonju
1984 births
Living people
South Korean film actresses
South Korean television actresses
University of Suwon alumni
Pungyang Jo clan